Matthias Jaissle (born 5 April 1988) is a German football manager, and former player who played as a defender. He was previously the assistant manager of Brøndby IF, and in 2021 became the manager of FC Liefering, then subsequently of Austrian Bundesliga side Red Bull Salzburg, where he currently coaches.

He was a member of the 1899 Hoffenheim team that won promotion to the 2. Bundesliga as well as to the Bundesliga the following season.

Managerial career
On 3 April 2017, it was confirmed that Jaissle would be the assistant of manager Alexander Zorniger of Danish Superliga side Brøndby IF starting from the summer 2017. He left Brøndby IF on 1 June 2019. A few weeks later, he was hired as manager for FC Red Bull Salzburg's U18 academy team.

In January 2021, he was appointed new head coach of FC Liefering after Bo Svensson left the club.

Managerial statistics

Honours

Manager
Red Bull Salzburg
Austrian Bundesliga: 2021–22
Austrian Cup: 2021–22

References

External links

 
 Matthias Jaissle at kicker.de 

1988 births
Living people
People from Nürtingen
Sportspeople from Stuttgart (region)
German footballers
Germany under-21 international footballers
TSG 1899 Hoffenheim players
TSG 1899 Hoffenheim II players
Association football defenders
Bundesliga players
2. Bundesliga players
Footballers from Baden-Württemberg
German expatriate football managers
German expatriate sportspeople in Austria
Expatriate football managers in Austria
FC Liefering managers
Brøndby IF non-playing staff